Bang Saphan Yai station is a railway station located in Kamnoet Nopphakhun Subdistrict, Bang Saphan District, Prachuap Khiri Khan, Thailand.

The station opened in March 1915 as part of the Ban Krut-Bang Saphan Yai Southern Line Section. The line continued in September 1916 to Chumphon.

Train services 
 Special Express 43/44 Bangkok-Surat Thani-Bangkok
 Special Express 35/36 Bangkok-Padang Besar-Bangkok
 Special Express 37/38 Bangkok-Sungai Kolok-Bangkok
 Rapid 171/172 Bangkok-Sungai Kolok-Bangkok
 Rapid 169/170 Bangkok-Yala-Bangkok
 Express 83/84 Bangkok-Trang-Bangkok
 Rapid 173/174 Bangkok-Nakhon Si Thammarat-Bangkok
 Rapid 167/168 Bangkok-Kantang-Bangkok
 Express 85/86 Bangkok-Nakhon Si Thammarat-Bangkok
 Special Express 39/40 Bangkok-Surat Thani-Bangkok
 Special Express 41/42 Bangkok-Yala-Bangkok
 Ordinary 254/255 Lang Suan-Thon Buri-Lang Suan
 Rapid 177/178 Thon Buri-Lang Suan-Thon Buri

References 
 
 
 
 
 
 

Railway stations in Thailand
Railway stations opened in 1915